This is a list of aircraft in alphabetical order beginning with 'N'.

N

NA 
(NA Design formerly UNIS)
 NA 40 Bongo
 NA 42 Barracuda
 NA 44 Bion
 NA 50
 NA 542

NAC 
(National Aeroplane Co, Chicago, IL and Galveston, TX)
 Beech-Farman aka Beech-National

NAC 
(National Aircraft Corp)
 NAC Dream

NAC
(Norman Aeroplane Company Ltd.)
 NAC Fieldmaster
 NAC Firemaster 65

NAGL System
(Weißkirchen in Steiermark, Austria)
NAGL System NAGL

Nagler 
(Nagler Helicopter Company Inc, White Plains, NY)
 Nagler Honcho 100
 Nagler Honcho 200
 Nagler Honcho 202
 Nagler NH-120
 Nagler NH-140
 Nagler NH-160
 Nagler NH-170
 Nagler VG-1 Vertigyro
 Nagler VG-2
 Nagler XNH-1 Heliglider
 Nagler XNH-2 Heligyro

Nagler-Rolz 
(Bruno Nagler & Franz Rolz)
 Nagler-Rolz NR-54 V1
 Nagler-Rolz NR-54 V2
 Nagler-Rolz NR-55

Naglo 
(Naglo Bootswerft / Fritz Naglo)
 Naglo D.i (Quadruplane)
 Naglo D.II (Biplane)

Nagy
(Hugó Nagy)
 Nagy Nádi

Nagy-Bansagi
(Hugó Nagy & Bansagi)
 Nagy-Bansagi Bene

Nagy-Cserkuti
(Hugó Nagy & János Cserkuti)
 Nagy-Cserkuti Botond

Nakajima 
(Japanese:中島飛行機株式会社 - Nakajima Hikōki Kabushiki Gaisha - Nakajima Aircraft Company) / (Nakajima Hikoki KK - Nakajima Aeroplane Company Ltd.)
 Nakajima Type 1 Biplane
 Nakajima Type 3 Biplane
 Nakajima Type 4 Biplane
 Nakajima Type 5 Biplane
 Nakajima Type 6 Biplane
 Nakajima Type 7 Biplane
 Nakajima Type 4 Trainer
 Nakajima Type 5 Trainer
 Nakajima Bulldog Fighter
 Nakajima-Breguet Reconnaissance Seaplane
 Nakajima-Douglas DC-2 Transport
 Nakajima-Fokker Super Universal
 Nakajima-Fokker Ambulance Aircraft
 Nakajima Akatsuki
 Nakajima Fishery Seaplane
 Nakajima AN-1
 Nakajima AT-1
 Nakajima AT-2
 Nakajima B-6 Biplane
 Nakajima DB
 Nakajima DF
 Nakajima K
 Nakajima Ko-4
 Nakajima LB-2
 Nakajima MS
 Nakajima N-19
 Nakajima N-35
 Nakajima N-36
 Nakajima NAF-1
 Nakajima NAF-2
 Nakajima NC
 Nakajima NK1F
 Nakajima NJ
 Nakajima NY
 Nakajima NZ
 Nakajima P-1
 Nakajima PA
 Nakajima PA-Kai
 Nakajima Type PE
 Nakajima Q
 Nakajima RZ
 Nakajima S
 Nakajima Y3B
 Nakajima YM
 Nakajima A1N
 Nakajima A2N
 Nakajima A3N
 Nakajima A4N
 Nakajima A6M2-N
 Nakajima B3N
 Nakajima B4N
 Nakajima B5N
 Nakajima B6N Tenzan
 Nakajima C2N
 Nakajima C3N
 Nakajima C6N Saiun
 Nakajima D2N
 Nakajima D3N
 Nakajima E2N
 Nakajima E4N
 Nakajima E8N
 Nakajima E12N
 Nakajima G5N Shinzan
 Nakajima G8N Renzan
 Nakajima G10N Fugaku
 Nakajima J1N Gekko
 Nakajima J5N Tenrai
 Nakajima L1N
 Nakajima Ki-4
 Nakajima Ki-6
 Nakajima Ki-8
 Nakajima Ki-11
 Nakajima Ki-12
 Nakajima Ki-13
 Nakajima Ki-16
 Nakajima Ki-19
 Nakajima Ki-27
 Nakajima Ki-31
 Nakajima Ki-34
 Nakajima Ki-37
 Nakajima Ki-41
 Nakajima Ki-43 Hayabusa/Army Type 1 Fighter
 Nakajima Ki-44 Shoki
 Nakajima Ki-49 Donryu
 Nakajima Ki-52
 Nakajima Ki-53
 Nakajima Ki-58
 Nakajima Ki-62
 Nakajima Ki-63
 Nakajima Ki-68
 Nakajima Ki-75
 Nakajima Ki-80
 Nakajima Ki-84 Hayate/Army Type 4 Fighter
 Nakajima Ki-87
 Nakajima Ki-101
 Nakajima Ki-106 (Wood Ki-84)
 Nakajima Ki-113
 Nakajima Ki-115 Tsurugi
 Nakajima Ki-116 (Ki-84 variant)
 Nakajima Ki-117
 Nakajima Ki-201 Karyu
 Nakajima Ki-230
 Nakajima Army Model 2 Ground Taxi-ing Trainer
 Nakajima Army Type Ko 2 Trainer
 Nakajima Army Type Ko 3 Fighter/Trainer
 Nakajima Army Type Ko 4 Fighter
 Nakajima Army Type 91 Fighter
 Nakajima Army Type 94 Reconnaissance Aircraft
 Nakajima Army Type 95-2 Crew Trainer
 Nakajima Army Type 97 Transport
 Nakajima Army Type 97 Fighter
 Nakajima Army Type 100 Heavy Bomber
 Nakajima Army Type 2 Single-Seat Fighter
 Nakajima Army Special Attacker Tsurugi
 Nakajima Navy Experimental 6-shi Carrier Two-seat Fighter
 Nakajima Navy Experimental Kusho 6-shi Dive Bomber
 Nakajima Navy Experimental 7-shi Dive Bomber
 Nakajima Navy Experimental 7-shi Carrier Fighter
 Nakajima Navy Experimental 7-shi Carrier Attack Aircraft
 Nakajima Navy Experimental 8-shi Carrier Two-seat Fighter
 Nakajima Navy Experimental 8-shi Reconnaissance Seaplane
 Nakajima Navy Experimental 8-shi Carrier Bomber (aka Special Bomber)
 Nakajima Navy Experimental 9-shi Carrier Attack Aircraft
 Nakajima Navy Experimental 9-shi Carrier Single-seat Fighter
 Nakajima Navy Experimental 10-shi Carrier Attacker (B5N)
 Nakajima Navy Experimental 10-shi Carrier Reconnaissance Plane
 Nakajima Navy Experimental 11-shi Carrier Bomber
 Nakajima Navy Experimental 12-shi Two-seat Reconnaissance Seaplane
 Nakajima Navy Experimental 12-shi Carrier Fighter
 Nakajima Navy Experimental 13-shi Three-seat Fighter
 Nakajima Navy Experimental 13-shi Attack Bomber Shinzan
 Nakajima Navy Experimental 14-shi Carrier Attacker Tenzan
 Nakajima Navy Experimental 15-shi Fighter Seaplane
 Nakajima Navy Experimental 17-shi Carrier Reconnaissance Plane Saiun
 Nakajima Navy Experimental 18-shi Attack Bomber Renzan
 Nakajima Navy Experimental 18-shi Otsu (B) Type Interceptor Fighter Tenrai
 Nakajima Navy Experimental LB-2 Long-range Attack Aircraft
 Nakajima Navy Experimental Super Heavy Bomber Fugaku
 Nakajima Navy Type 2 Fighter Seaplane
 Nakajima Navy Type 2 Land Attack Plane
 Nakajima Navy Type 2 Land Reconnaissance Plane
 Nakajima Navy Type 2 Night Fighter
 Nakajima Navy Type 3 Carrier Fighter
 Nakajima Navy Type 15 Reconnaissance Seaplane
 Nakajima Navy Type 90 Training Fighter
 Nakajima Navy Type 90 Carrier Fighter
 Nakajima Navy Type 90-2 Reconnaissance Seaplane
 Nakajima Navy Type 90-2-2 Reconnaissance Seaplane
 Nakajima Navy Type 90-2-3 Reconnaissance Seaplane
 Nakajima Navy Type 95 Carrier Fighter
 Nakajima Navy Type 95 Reconnaissance Seaplane
 Nakajima Navy Type 97-1 Carrier Attack Bomber
 Nakajima Navy Type 97-3 Carrier Attack Bomber
 Nakajima Navy Type 97 Carrier Reconnaissance Aircraft
 Nakajima Navy Type 97 Reconnaissance Seaplane
 Nakajima Navy Type 97 Transport
 Nakajima Navy Carrier Attack Bomber Tenzan
 Nakajima Navy Fokker Reconnaissance Plane
 Nakajima Navy Carrier Reconnaissance Plane Saiun
 Nakajima Navy Night Fighter Gekko
 Nakajima Kōkoku Nigō Heiki (皇国二号兵器 Imperial Weapon No.2) Kikka

NAL
(National Aerospace Laboratories of India / Taneja Aerospace and Aviation Limited)
 NAL Hansa
 NAL NM5
 NAL Saras

NAL 
(Japanese National Aerospace Laboratory)
 NAL VTOL test rig

NAMC 
(Nihon Aircraft Manufacturing Corporation)
 NAMC YS-11

Nanchang 
(Nanchang Aircraft Manufacturing Co.)
(changed name to Hongdu)
 Nanchang A-5
 Nanchang Q-5
 Nanchang Q-6 MiG-23 based project
 Nanchang CJ-5
 Nanchang CJ-6
 Nanchang J-12
 Nanchang K-8 Karakorum
 Nanchang Y-5
 Nanchang Jing Gang Shan-4
 Nanchang N-5A
 Nanchang N-5B
 Nanchang Haiyan

Nanchang/Hongdu 
 Nanchang/Hongdu JL-8

Nanjing Institute of Aeronautics 
 ChangKong-1
 NAI AD-100 Traveller

Nanjing Light Aircraft Co. 
 NLA AC-500 Aircar

Narahara 
(Sanji Narahara / Tokyo Hikoki Sesakusho - Tokyo Aeroplane Manufacturing Works)
 Narahara No.1
 Narahara No.1
 Narahara No.1
 Narahara No.1 Ohtori-go

Nardi 
(Fratelli Nardi)
 Nardi FN.305
 Nardi FN.310
 Nardi FN.315
 Nardi FN.316
 Nardi FN.333
 Nardi FN.500

NARP 
(Nikolaev Aircraft Repair Plant)
 NARP-1

Narushevich
 Narushevich Ring Wing

NAS 
(National Airways System Inc (founders: Glenn J Romkey & Shukri F Tannus), Lomax, IL)
 NAS Air King 1926 (1)
 NAS Air King 1926 (2)
 NAS Air King Dole racer
 NAS Air King 1928
 NAS Air King Mono-4
 NAS Air Prince

NASA 
 NASA AD-1
 NASA Centurion
 NASA Helios
 NASA Hyper III
 NASA M2-F1
 NASA Paresev
 NASA Pathfinder
 NASA Pathfinder Plus
 NASA Puffin
 NASA Electric Aircraft Testbed (ground-based testbed)
 NASA Prandtl D
 NASA X-57 Maxwell
 NASA Ingenuity helicopter

Nash 
((Paul) Nash Aircraft Co, Chapin, IL)
 Nash N

Nash 
(Nash Aircraft Ltd.)
 Nash Petrel

Nash-Kelvinator 
(Kelvinator Div, Nash-Kelvinator Corp, Detroit, MI)
 Nash-Kelvinator JRK
 Nash-Kelvinator R-6 Hoverfly - licence production of the Sikorsky R-6

National 
(National Aircraft Corp, Watts Airport, Beaverton, OR)
 National Bluebird C-3
 National Bluebird LP-1
 National Bluebird LP-3
 National Bluebird LP-4
 National Bluebird S-1

National 
(National Airplane & Motor Co, 2810 E 11 St, Los Angeles, CA)
 National 1940 Aeroplane

National 
(National Aircraft Corp, 3411 Tulare Ave, Burbank, CA)
 National NA-75

National 
(National Motors Corp, Stout Field, Indianapolis, IN)
 National S-90
 National S-125

National Wingless 
(National Wingless Aircraft Inc, 410 Donner Ave, Monessen, PA)
 National Wingless 1935 Aeroplane

Nationale Vliegtuig Industrie
see NVI

NAU
(Nanchang Aviation University)
 NAU Black-headed Gull

Naugle 
((Harry C & Richard G) Naugle Aircraft Corp, Latrobe, PA)
 Naugle Mercury N-1
 Naugle Mercury N-2

NAV
(Nederlandsche Automobiel en Vliegteuig Ondernemin)
 NAV.6

Naval Air Establishment 
(Imperial Chinese Navy)
 Naval Air Establishment Chiang Hung (1930) - 2 or 3 seat touring plane and reconnaissance aircraft
 Naval Air Establishment Chiang Hau (1932) - powered with single 165 hp Wright Whirlwind engine 
 Naval Air Establishment Chiang Gaen
 Naval Air Establishment Ning Hai
 DH.6 like seaplane
 Naval Air Establishment Beeng (1918?) - tractor biplane/float fighter bomber with single 360 hp prop engine
 Naval Air Establishment Char 1918 - 2 seat primary trainer seaplane
 Naval Air Establishment Ding (1934) - 2 seat bombing/torpedo seaplane using a single 360 hp Rolls-Royce engine
 Naval Air Establishment Wu (1918?) - general purpose observation aircraft
 Naval Air Establishment Yee (1918?) - 2 seat advance trainer and variant of Char seaplane

Naval Aircraft Factory 
Naval Aircraft Factory BN
Naval Aircraft Factory BS
Naval Aircraft Factory FN
Naval Aircraft Factory GB (Giant Boat)
Naval Aircraft Factory LRN
Naval Aircraft Factory LR2N
Naval Aircraft Factory N
Naval Aircraft Factory N2N
Naval Aircraft Factory N3N Canary
Naval Aircraft Factory N5N
Naval Aircraft Factory NM
Naval Aircraft Factory NO
Naval Aircraft Factory O2N
Naval Aircraft Factory OSN
Naval Aircraft Factory OS2N
Naval Aircraft Factory SON Seagull
Naval Aircraft Factory OS2N Kingfisher
Naval Aircraft Factory PBN Catalina
Naval Aircraft Factory PN
Naval Aircraft Factory P2N
Naval Aircraft Factory P4N
Naval Aircraft Factory PT
Naval Aircraft Factory SA
Naval Aircraft Factory SBN
Naval Aircraft Factory SON
Naval Aircraft Factory SP (Mercury Racer)
Naval Aircraft Factory T2N
Naval Aircraft Factory TDN
Naval Aircraft Factory TD2N
Naval Aircraft Factory TD3N
Naval Aircraft Factory TF
Naval Aircraft Factory TG
Naval Aircraft Factory TS
Naval Aircraft Factory TN

Navarro
(Navarro Safety Aircraft / Joseph Navarro)
 Navarro Chief
 Navarro Naiad

Navion 
(Navion Aircraft Corp, Seguin, TX)
 Navion Model H
 Navion Rangemaster G-1

NAVO 
(Nederlandse Automobiel en-Vleegtuig Onderneming - Dutch Motorcar and Aircraft Co.)
 NAVO RK-P4/220

NDN 
(NDN Aircraft Ltd.)
 NDN-1 Firecracker
 NDN-1T Turbo Firecracker
 NDN-6 Fieldmaster

Neau 
(Robert Neau)
 Neau NR.01 Farfadet

Nederlands Automobile and Aeroplane Co
see: Spijker

Neilson 
((Thomas S & Duncan S) Neilson Steel Aircraft Co, Berkeley, CA)
 Neilson NC-1 Golden Bear

Neiva
(Sociedade Aeronáutica Neiva SA / Indústria Aeronáutica Neiva SA / Sociedade Constructora Aeronáutica Neiva SA)
 Neiva P-56 Agricola
 Neiva BN-1 1950s glider
 Neiva BN-2 glider
 Neiva B Monitor glider
 Neiva Brasilia
 Neiva Campeiro
 Neiva Carajá
 Neiva Corisco (Cherokee Arrow II)
 Neiva Ipanema
 Neiva Lanceiro
 Neiva Minuano
 Neiva Paulistinha 56
 Neiva Rebocador
 Neiva Regente
 Neiva Seneca
 Neiva Sertanejo
 Neiva Universal
 Neiva N-582
 Neiva N-591
 Neiva N-592

Nelsch 
(William Nelsch, St Louis, MO)
 Nelsch Monoplane

Nelson 
(Norman Nelson, Cloquet, MN)
 Nelson Trainer

Nelson 
(Nelson Aircraft Corp, San Fernando, CA)
 Nelson Bumblebee
 Nelson Dragonfly
 Nelson Humming Bird

Nelson 
(Raymond Nelson, Tacoma, WA, 19??: Deer Park, NY)
 Nelson N-1 Special
 Nelson N-4

Nelson 
(Bob Nelson, Pendleton, OR)
 Nelson 1-B Special
 Nelson Sport

Nelson 
(Robert Nelson)
 Nelson Star Lance 1

Nelson-Driscoll 
(Nels J Nelson & Benjamin B Driscoll, 176 E Main St, New Britain and Wallingford Airport, CT)
 Nelson-Driscoll Fleet Wing

Nemeth 
(Steven Paul Nemeth, Chicago, IL)
 Nemeth Umbrellaplane

Nennig
 Nennig C-3
 Nennig C-5

Nervures
(Soulom, France)
Nervures Aloha
Nervures Alpamayo
Nervures Altea
Nervures Arteson
Nervures Diamir
Nervures Estive
Nervures Etna
Nervures Erebus
Nervures Espade
Nervures Everglades
Nervures Faial
Nervures Huapi
Nervures Kailash
Nervures Kenya
Nervures Lhotse
Nervures LOL
Nervures Morea
Nervures Spantik
Nervures Stromboli
Nervures Swoop
Nervures Toubkal
Nervures Valluna
Nervures Whizz

Nesmith 
(Robert E Nesmith, Houston, TX)
 Nesmith Cougar
 Nesmith Cougar Comet
 Nesmith Chigger

Neubert 
(Wil Neubert, Long Beach and San Luis Obispo, CA)
 Neubert Nostalgia

Neukom 
(Albert Neukom Segelflugzeugbau / Werner Pfenniger & Albert Markwalder)
 Neukom AN-20B Albatros 
 Neukom AN-100

Neumann 
(Everett Neumann, Ham Lake, MN)
 Neumann N-2

Neunteufel 
(Al Neunteufel)
 Neunteufel Mini-Copter

NeuraJet
(Senftenbach, Austria)
NeuraJet Neura Jet

Neuschloss-Lichtig
 NL Sportplane

New Avio 
 New Avio C205

New England 
(New England Air Transport Co (aka NEAT Co) (Pres: George H Armitage), Jefferson Ave, Hillsgrove, RI)
 New England F-2
 New England F-2-WG

New Era 
(New Era Aircraft Corp, Butler, PA)
 New Era Model A
 New Era Model B

New Kolb 
 Kolb Flyer Super Sport
 Kolb Flyer
 Kolb Flyer Powered Parachute
 Kolb Ultrastar
 Kolb Firefly
 Kolb Firestar
 Kolb Mark III
 Kolb Slingshot
 Kolb Kolbra
 Kolb Pelican

New PowerChutes
(Alberton, Gauteng, South Africa)
New PowerChutes Gemini

New Standard 
(Standard Aircraft Corp, Paterson, NJ)
 New Standard D-24
 New Standard D-25
 New Standard D-26
 New Standard D-27
 New Standard D-28
 New Standard D-29
 New Standard D-30
 New Standard D-31
 New Standard D-32
 New Standard D-33
 New Standard NT-1
 New Standard NT-2

New York 
(New York Aero Construction Co, Newark, NJ)
 New York 1916 Biplane

Newbauer 
((Valentine) Newbauer Vertical Airplane Co, Monterey Park, CA)
 Newbauer 1927 Helicopter
 Newbauer Hummingbird

Newhouse 
((Richard A and Werner A) Newhouse Flying Service, Rocky Hill-Princeton, NJ)
 Newhouse 1911 Biplane
 Newhouse NS-1

Newland 
(K C "Casey" Newland, Harvey, IL)
 Newland B-45

Newman 
(William L Newman, Carlsbad, CA)
 Newman 1935 Monoplane

Newman 
(Harley Newman, Carlsbad, CA)
 Newman RA-20

Nexaer
(Peyton, CO)
Nexaer LS1

Nexus 
(Richard Eaves)
 Nexus Mustang

Neybar
(Neyeloff and Barandeguy)
 Neybar N.1

NFS 
(Nippon Hiko Gakko - Nippon Flying School)
 NFS Tamai No.1
 NFS Tamai No.2
 NFS Tamai No.3

N.F.W. 
(National Flugzeug-Werke G.m.b.H.)
 NFW B.I
 NFW E.I
 NFW E.II
 NFW Experimental monoplane

N.F.W.
(Nordwestdeutsche Flugzeugwerke / Heinrich Evers & Co., Bremervörde)
 NFW E.5

NHI 
(Nederlandse Helikopter Industrie)
 NHI H-2
 NHI H-3 Kolibrie

NHI 
 NHI NH90

NIAI 
(Nauchno-Issledovatelskii Aero-Institut - scientific research aero-institute)
 NIAI LK
 NIAI LIG-8
 NIAI RK
 NIAI LIG-7
 NIAI RK-I
 NIAI RK-2
 NIAI LK-1
 NIAI 1
 NIAI LK-4
 NIAI-4
 NIAI P-3
 NIAI LIG-5
 NIAI DP
 NIAI OB
 NIAI ON
 NIAI LEM-3
 NIAI LIG-6
 NIAI SKh-1
 NIAI LIG-10
 OSh

Nicholas-Beazley 
(Nicholas-Beazley Airplane Co., Marshall, MO)
 Nicholas-Beazley NB-3 (a.k.a. Barling NB-3)
 Nicholas-Beazley NB-4
 Nicholas-Beazley NB-7
 Nicholas-Beazley NB-8G
 Nicholas-Beazley NB-PG
 Nicholas-Beazley Phantom I a.k.a. Pobjoy Special
 Nicholas-Beazley-Standard modified Standard J-1
 Nicholas-Beasley Pobjoy Special
 Nicholas-Beasley Reaver Special

Nichols 
(A H Nichols, Rochester, NY)
 Nichols 1910 Monoplane

Nichols 
(A H Nichols, Rochester, NY)
 Nichols Fusion

Nicholson 
(Hugh G Nicholson Jr, NY)
 Nicholson Junior KN-2

Nickel & Foucard 
(Rudy nickel & Joseph Foucard)
 Nickel & Foucard NF.001 Asterix
 Nickel & Foucard NF-2 Asterix

Nicolas-Claude
 Nicolas-Claude NC-2 Aquilon

Nicollier
 Nicollier HN 433 Menestrel
 Nicollier HN 434 Super Menestrel
 Nicollier HN 500 Bengali
 Nicollier HN 600 Week-end
 Nicollier HN 700 Menestrel II
 Nicollier HN 800

Nielsen & von Lübcke
(Nielsen & von Lübcke G.m.b.H.)
 Nielsen & von Lübcke Eindecker

Nielsen & Winther
(A/S Nielsen & Winther)
 Nielsen & Winther Type Aa
 Nielsen & Winther Type Ab
 Nielsen & Winther Type Ac
 Nielsen & Winther Type Bd
 Nielsen & Winther Type Da?4-person “Tourist-aircraft” (maybe called the Type Da)?
 Nielsen & Winther Type C
 Nielsen & Winther Type E
 Nielsen & Winther Type Fa

Nieman 
(Hilbert (Burton) Nieman, MN)
 Nieman Burtster

Niess
(William Niess)
 Niess I-200
 Niess 5FG

Nieuport 
(Société Générale d'Aéro-locomotion / Société Anonyme des Établissements Nieuport)
 Nieuport I
 Nieuport IIA
 Nieuport IID
 Nieuport IIG
 Nieuport IIN
 Nieuport IIIA
 Nieuport IV
 Nieuport IVG
 Nieuport IVM
 Nieuport VIG
 Nieuport VIH
 Nieuport VIM
 Nieuport 10
 Nieuport 11
 Nieuport 12
 Nieuport 12bis
 Nieuport 13
 Nieuport 14
 Nieuport 15
 Nieuport 16
 Nieuport 17
 Nieuport 17bis
 Nieuport 18
 Nieuport 19
 Nieuport 20
 Nieuport 21
 Nieuport 23
 Nieuport 23bis
 Nieuport 24
 Nieuport 24bis
 Nieuport 25
 Nieuport 26
 Nieuport 27
 Nieuport 28
 Nieuport 29
 Nieuport 30T
 Nieuport 31
 Nieuport 80
 Nieuport 81
 Nieuport 82
 Nieuport 83
 Nieuport 120
 Nieuport 140
 Nieuport 160
 Nieuport 1913
 Nieuport Madon
 Nieuport monoplane
 Nieuport Scout
 Nieuport Triplane#1
 Nieuport Triplane#2
 Nieuport S (Tellier T.6)
 Nieuport 4R (Tellier Vonna)
 Nieuport BM (Tellier T.5)
 Nieuport TM (Tellier T.8)

Nieuport & General Aircraft 
 Nieuport B.N.1
 Nieuport Nighthawk
 Nieuport London
 Nieuport Nightjar

Nieuport-Delage
Data from: 
 Nieuport-Delage NiD 29
 Nieuport-Delage Sesquiplan
 Nieuport-Delage NiD 30
 Nieuport-Delage NiD 31
 Nieuport-Delage NiD 32
 Nieuport-Delage NiD 33
 Nieuport-Delage NiD 37
 Nieuport-Delage NiD 38
 Nieuport-Delage NiD 39
 Nieuport-Delage NiD 40
 Nieuport-Delage NiD 41
 Nieuport-Delage NiD 42
 Nieuport-Delage NiD 43
 Nieuport-Delage NiD 44
 Nieuport-Delage NiD 450
 Nieuport-Delage NiD 46
 Nieuport-Delage NiD 48
 Nieuport-Delage NiD 481
 Nieuport-Delage NiD 48bis
 Nieuport-Delage NiD 50 HB.4
 Nieuport-Delage NiD 52
 Nieuport-Delage NiD 540
 Nieuport-Delage NiD 580
 Nieuport-Delage NiD 590
 Nieuport-Delage NiD 62
 Nieuport-Delage NiD 640
 Nieuport-Delage NiD 650
 Nieuport-Delage NiD 690
 Nieuport-Delage NiD 72
 Nieuport-Delage NiD 740
 Nieuport-Delage NiD 82
 Nieuport-Delage NiD 940
 Nieuport-Delage NiD 941
 Nieuport-Delage NiD 942
 Nieuport-Delage NiD 120
 Nieuport-Delage NiD 121
 Nieuport-Delage NiD 122
 Nieuport-Delage NiD 123
 Nieuport-Delage NiD 125

Nieuport-Macchi
( Giulio Macchi, Varese)
Nieuport-Macchi N.VI
Nieuport-Macchi Parasol
Nieuport-Macchi N.10
Nieuport-Macchi N.11
Nieuport-Macchi N.17

Nihon University 
Data from:
 Nihon N-58 Shigunetto (Cygnet)
 Nihon N-62 Eaglet
 Nihon NM-63 Linnet I
 Nihon NM-66 Linnet II
 Nihon NM-69 Linnet III
 Nihon N-70 Cygnus
 Nihon NM-72 Egret 1
 Nihon NM-73 Egret 2
 Nihon NM-74 Egret 3
 Nihon N-75 Cygnus II
 Nihon NM-75 Stork A
 Nihon Ibis
 Nihon Linnet IV
 Nihon Linnet V
 Nihon MiLan 81
 Nihon MiLan 82
 Nihon Stork A
 Nihon Stork B
 Nihon Ibis
 Nihon Milan 81
 Nihon Milan 82
 Nihon Swift A
 Nihon Swift B
 Nihon Swift C
 Nihon Mowe I
 Nihon Mowe II
 Nihon Mowe III
 Nihon Mowe IV
 Nihon Mowe V
 Nihon Mowe VI
 Nihon Mowe VII
 Nihon Mowe VIII
 Nihon Mowe IX
 Nihon Mowe X
 Nihon Mowe XIII
 Nihon Mowe XIV
 Nihon Mowe XV
 Nihon A Day Fly
 Nihon Papillion A
 Nihon Papillion B
 Nihon Papillion C
 Nihon Yuri I
 Nihon Yuri II
 Nihon Yuri III- 1994 Human Power, almost certainly a typo for Yuri I
 Nihon Sakuzo 1
 Nihon Sakuzo 2
 Nihon Sakuzo 3
 Nihon Sakuzo 4

Niki Rotor Aviation
(Pravets, Bulgaria)
Niki 2004
Niki 2004M
Niki 2008
Niki 2009
Niki Lightning
Niki Kallithea

Nippon 
(Nippon Kogata Hikoki KK - Japan Small Aeroplane Co Ltd.)
 Nippon Hachi Motor-glider
 Nihon Kogata Ku-11
 Nihon Kogata K8P
 Nihon Kogata L7P
 Nihon Kogata Navy Experimental 12-Shi Primary Trainer Seaplane
 Nihon Kogata Navy Experimental 13-Shi Small Amphibious Transport
 Nihon Kogata MXJ1
 Nihon Kogata Navy Primary Training Glider Wakakusa

Nikitin 
(Vasilii Vasilyevich Nikitin)
 Nikitin NV-1
 Nikitin NV-2
 Nikitin NV-2bis
 Nikitin NV-4
 Nikitin MU-4
 Nikitin PSN-1
 Nikitin PSN-2
 Nikitin MU-4
 Nikitin MU-5
 Nikitin NV-5
 Nikitin NV-5bis
 Nikitin LSh
 Nikitin NV-6
 Nikitin-Shevchenko IS-1
 Nikitin-Shevchenko IS-2
 Nikitin-Shevchenko IS-4
 Nikitin UTI-5
 Nikitin U-5
 Nikitin U-5bis
 Nikitin U-5/MG-31
 Nikitin UTI-6

Niles 
(Niles Aircraft Corporation / Joe Niles, Ephrata, WA)
 Williams Gold Tip
 Niles 1928 monoplane

Nilsson
(Erland Nilsson)
 Nilsson Beda (aka Sjöflygplanet "Beda")

Nimmo 
(Rod Nimmo, Albuquerque, NM)
 Nimmo NAC-SB-1
 Nimmo Special a.k.a. Argander Special
 Nimmo Smirnoff Special

Nippi 
(a.k.a. Nippi, Nihon Aeroplane Co Ltd. - Nihon Hikoki KK)
 Nippi NH-1 Hibari
 Nippi Navy Experimental 12-shi Primary Seaplane Trainer
 Nippi Navy Experimental 13-shi Small Transport
 Nippi K8N1
 Nihon Hikoki X1G1
 Nihon Hikoki X1G1B
 Nihon Hikoki X1G2A
 Nihon Hikoki X1G2B
 Nihon Hikoki X1G3

Nishida 
(Matsuzo Nishida)
 Nishida Sport Aeroplane

Nix 
(Tommy H Nix, Guin, AL)
 Nix Baby Beech 18 modified Ercoupe

Nixon 
(John F Nixon, Philadelphia, PA)
 Nixon Special

Noel
(Cecil Noel, Guernsey)
 Noel Wee Mite

Noel
(Noel - WWI France)
 Noel reconnaissance biplane

Noin
 Noin Choucas
 Noin Sirius

Noorduyn 
(Noorduyn Aircraft Ltd)
 Noorduyn Norseman

Nord 

 Nord 1000 Pingouin
 Nord 1001 Pingouin I
 Nord 1002 Pingouin II
 Nord 1100 Noralpha
 Nord 1101 Noralpha
 Nord 1102 Noralpha
 Nord 1104 Noralpha
 Nord 1110 Nord-Astazou
 Nord 1200 Norécrin
 Nord 1201 Norécrin
 Nord 1202 Norécrin II
 Nord 1203 Norécrin II
 Nord 1203 Norécrin III
 Nord 1203 Norécrin IV
 Nord 1203 Norécrin V
 Nord 1204 Norécrin
 Nord 1221 Norélan
 Nord 1222 Norélan
 Nord 1223 Norélan
 Nord 1226 Norélan
 Nord 1300
 Nord 1400 Noroit
 Nord 1401 Noroit
 Nord 1402 Noroit
 Nord 1402A Gerfaut IA
 Nord 1402B Gerfaut IB
 Nord 1405 Gerfaut II
 Nord 1500 Noréclair
 Nord 1500 Griffon I
 Nord 1500 Griffon II
 Nord 1601
 Nord 1700 Norélic
 Nord 1710
 Nord 1750 Norelfe
 Nord 2000
 Nord 2100 Norazurt
 Nord 2200
 Nord 2210
 Nord 2500 Noratlas
 Nord 2501 Noratlas
 Nord 2502 Noratlas
 Nord 2503 Noratlas
 Nord 2504 Noratlas
 Nord 2506 Noratlas
 Nord 2507 Noratlas
 Nord 2508 Noratlas
 Nord 2509 Noratlas Canceled
 Nord 2510 Noratlas Canceled
 Nord 2520 Noratlas Canceled
 Nord 2800
 Nord 3200
 Nord 3201
 Nord 3202
 Nord 3212
 Nord 3400 Norbarbe
 Nord 260
 Nord 262
 Nord 500
 Nord CT10
 Nord CT20	
 Nord CT41
 Nord R20
 Nord NC.853S
 Nord NC.853G
 Nord NC.854
 Nord NC.854SA
 Nord NC.856	
 Nord NC.856A Norvegie
 Nord NC.856B
 Nord NC.856H
 Nord NC.856N Norclub
 Nord NC.858S
 Nord NC.859S
 Nord Super Griffon

Nordflug
(Norddeutschen Flugzeugewerken Teltow, Berlin)
 Nordflug FB 1

Nordic Aircraft
(Nordic Aircraft AS, Kinsarvik, Norway)
Nordic Omsider

Norman Aviation
Norman Aviation J6 Karatoo
Norman Aviation Nordic I
Norman Aviation Nordic II
Norman Aviation Nordic III
Norman Aviation Nordic IV
Norman Aviation Nordic V
Norman Aviation Nordic VI
Norman Aviation Nordic VII
Norman Aviation Nordic 8 Mini Explorer

Norman Thompson
 Norman Thompson N.T.4
 Norman Thompson N.T.2B
 Norman Thompson N.1B
 Norman Thompson N.2C

Normand Dube
(Aviation Normand Dube)
 Normand Dube Aerocruiser Plus
 Normand Dube Aerocruiser 450 Turbo

Normande
(Société Aéronautique Normande - SAN)
 See: SAN

Norris 
((Rolla V) Norris Aircraft Manufacturer, San Francisco, CA)
 Norris Foolproof Aeroplane

Norsk Flyindustri
See:Hønningstad

Norske Hæren Flyfabrikk
 Flyfabrikk 1918 biplane

North
(Fred North)
 North Tui Sports

North American Aviation 
 North American A-2 Savage
 North American A-5 Vigilante
 North American A-27
 North American A-36 Apache
 North American AT-6
 North American AT-24
 North American AJ Savage
 North American A2J
 North American A3J Vigilante
 North American B-21
 North American B-25 Mitchell
 North American B-28 Dragon
 North American B-45 Tornado
 North American B-70 Valkyrie
 North American BC-1
 North American BC-2
 North American BT-9
 North American BT-10
 North American BT-14
 North American BT-28
 North American F-1 Fury
 North American F-6 Mustang
 North American F-19
 North American F-82 Twin Mustang
 North American F-86 Sabre
 North American F-93
 North American F-95
 North American F-100 Super Sabre
 North American F-107 Ultra Sabre
 North American F-108 Rapier
 North American FJ-1 Fury
 North American FJ-2/-3 Fury
 North American FJ-4 Fury
 North American FJ-5
 North American L-17
 North American NJ
 North American O-47
 North American P-51 Mustang
 North American P-64
 North American P-78
 North American P-82 Twin Mustang
 North American P-86
 North American PBJ
 North American PJ
 North American SM-64 Navaho
 North American SNJ
 North American SN2J
 North American T-2 Buckeye
 North American T-6 Texan
 North American T-28 Trojan
 North American T-39 Sabreliner
 North American T2J Buckeye
 North American T3J
 North American OV-10 Bronco
 North American X-10
 North American X-15
 North American FS-1 Hoverbuggy
 North American GA-38X
 North American KXA
 North American NA-16
 North American NA-19
 North American NA-19A
 North American NA-20
 North American NA-22
 North American NA-23
 North American NA-26
 North American NA-27
 North American NA-28
 North American NA-29
 North American NA-30
 North American NA-31
 North American NA-32
 North American NA-33
 North American NA-34
 North American NA-35
 North American NA-37
 North American NA-40
 North American NA-41
 North American NA-42
 North American NA-43
 North American NA-44
 North American NA-45
 North American NA-46
 North American NA-47
 North American NA-48
 North American NA-49
 North American NA-56
 North American NA-57
 North American NA-61
 North American NA-64 Yale
 North American NA-68
 North American NA-71
 North American NA-72
 North American NA-142
 North American NA-146
 North American NA-155
 North American NA-156
 North American NA-160
 North American NA-169
 North American NA-175
 North American NA-183
 North American NA-184
 North American NR-323
 North American NA-335
 North American NAC-60
 North American NAGPAW
 North American NR-349
 North American Harvard
 North American Sabreliner
 North American WS-300
 North American Yale
 North American Navion
 North American Navy Experimental Type A Intermediate Trainer

North American Rotorwerks 
 North American Rotorwerks Pitbull Ultralight
 North American Rotorwerks Pitbull SS
 North American Rotorwerks Pitbull II

North Wing Design
North Wing Apache
North Wing Apache 582 Contour
North Wing Apache 582 Mustang
North Wing Apache ST
North Wing ATF
North Wing Maverick
North Wing Maverick 103
North Wing Maverick Mustang
North Wing Maverick 2 Legend
North Wing Maverick 2 RT
North Wing Solairus
North Wing Sport X2

Northeast 
(Northeast Airways Inc (Conrad C Blom), 18 Elder St, Schenectady, NY, 1931: Amsterdam, NY)
 Northeast NA-1 CCB Special
 Northeast NA-2C Special
 Northeast NA-4R

Northern Aviatik Company 
 Northern Aviatik Type 9
 Northern Aviatik Type 11
 Northern Aviatik Type 12
 Northern Aviatik Type 14
 Northern Aviatik Type 17

Northern 
(Northern Aircraft Co, Alexandria, MN)
 Northern Cruisemaster 14-19-2

Northrop 
(Northrop Corporation / Jack Northrop)
 Northrop A-9
 Northrop A-13
 Northrop A-16
 Northrop A-17
 Northrop A-33
 Northrop B-35
 Northrop B-49
 Northrop BQM-74 Chukar
 Northrop BQM-108
 Northrop BT
 Northrop B2T
 Northrop C-19 Alpha
 Northrop C-100 Gamma
 Northrop C-125 Raider
 Northrop F-5 Freedom Fighter
 Northrop RF-5 Tigereye
 Northrop F-15 Reporter
 Northrop F-17 Cobra
 Northrop F-20 Tigershark
 Northrop F-61 Black Widow / Northrop P-61 Black Widow
 Northrop F-89 Scorpion
 Northrop FT
 Northrop F2T Black Widow
 Northrop JB-1 Bat
 Northrop XP-56 Black Bullet
 Northrop P-79
 Northrop XP-948
 Northrop RT
 Northrop T-38 Talon
 Northrop X-4 Bantam
 Northrop X-21
 Northrop 2
 Northrop 3A
 Northrop 5
 Northrop 8A
 Northrop Alpha
 Northrop Avion Experimental
 Northrop Beta
 Northrop BXN
 Northrop Gamma
 Northrop Delta
 Northrop Flying Wing 
 Northrop HL-10
 Northrop M2-F1
 Northrop M2-F2
 Northrop M2-F3
 Northrop MX-324
 Northrop MX-334
 Northrop MX-356
 Northrop MX-543
 Northrop MRF-54E
 Northrop N-1M
 Northrop N-2M
 Northrop N-3PB
 Northrop N-9M
 Northrop N-12
 Northrop N-14
 Northrop N-23 Pioneer
 Northrop N-156
 Northrop N-251
 Northrop N-309
 Northrop N-333
 Northrop N-336
 Northrop N-337
 Northrop N-340
 Northrop N-344
 Northrop N-353
 Northrop N-356
 Northrop N-369
 Northrop N-371
 Northrop N-381
 Northrop N-382
 Northrop Nomad
 Northrop NV-105
 Northrop NV-144
 Northrop Tacit Blue
 Northrop Grumman B-2 Spirit
 Northrop Grumman B-21 Raider
 Northrop Grumman E-2 Hawkeye
 Northrop Grumman E-8 Joint STARS
 Northrop Grumman E-10 MC2A
 Northrop Grumman F-27 Fury
 Northrop Grumman RQ-4 Global Hawk
 Northrop Grumman RQ-8A
 Northrop Grumman RQ-8B
 Northrop Grumman RQ-180
 Northrop Grumman MQ-8B Fire Scout
 Northrop Grumman MQ-8C Fire-X
 Northrop Grumman X-47 Pegasus
 Northrop Grumman X-47B
 Northrop Grumman Firebird
 Northrop Grumman NATF-23
 Northrop/McDonnell Douglas YF-23 Black Widow II

Northrup 
(Russell Northrup/Northrop and James R Williams, Rochester, NY)
 Northrup Special

Northwest 
(Northwest Aircraft & Motor Co (Pres: L F Duval), aka Clifford Aircraft Corp (gliders), 27 West & Commodore Way, Seattle. WA)
 Northwest Model A

Northwest Industries
(Edmonton, Alberta, Canada)
Northwest Ranger

Northwest Polytechnic University 
 Yan'an-1
 Yan'an-2 helicopter

Northwood 
(Dr R C Northwood, Nassau Blvd Aerodrome, Long Island, NY)
 Northwood aeroplane

Notteghem
(Louis-Henri Notteghem)
 Notteghem LN.01

Nourse 
(Wallace L Nourse & Victor Leighton, Kansas City, MO)
 Nourse 1926 Monoplane

Noury
(Noury Aircraft Ltd. / J.O.Noury)
 Noury T-65 Nouranda

Nova
(Nova Sp. z.o.o.)
 Nova Coden

Nova Performance Paragliders
(Innsbruck and later Terfens, Austria)
Nova Aeron
Nova Argon
Nova Artax
Nova Axon
Nova Bion
Nova Carbon
Nova CXC
Nova Factor
Nova Ibex
Nova Ion
Nova Jamboo
Nova Krypton
Nova Mamboo
Nova Mentor
Nova Oryx
Nova Phantom
Nova Pheron
Nova Philou
Nova Phocus
Nova Phönix
Nova Phor
Nova Phorus
Nova Primax
Nova Prion
Nova RA
Nova Radon
Nova Rookie
Nova Rotor
Nova Shockwave
Nova Speedmax
Nova Susi
Nova Susi Q
Nova Syntax
Nova Tatoo
Nova Trend
Nova Triton
Nova Tycoon
Nova X-ACT
Nova Xenon
Nova Xyon

Novaer 
 Novaer U-Xc Stardream
 Novaer-Calidus B-250 Bader
 Novaer T-Xc

Novitchi 
 Novitchi RG-6
 Novitchi RG-7

Nowotny
(Adam Nowotny)
 Nowotny N-y 4bis

Nozawa 
(NozawaKoku Kenkyusho - Nozawa Aviation Research Institute)
 Nozawa Z-1
 Nozawa X-1

NPO Molniya 
 Molniya-1

NSA 
(National Sport Aircraft Inc, Burbank, CA)
 NSA Genie

NST-Machinenbau
(Werther, North Rhine-Westphalia, Germany)
NST Minimum
NST Minimum 1+1

NUAA
(Nanjing University of Aeronautics and Astronautics)
 FT300

Nungesser
(Charles Nungesser)
 Nungesser Nua-1
 L'hydravion Canard de Nungesser (similar in airframe configuration to the Gee Bee Model Q Ascender)

Nuri Demirağ 
(Nuri Demirağ Aircraft Works), Turkey
 Nuri Demirağ Nu D.36
 Nuri Demirağ Nu D.38

Nurov-Elibekian
(N.K.Nurov and S.A.Elibekian)
 Nurov-Elibekian Avianito

Nurtanio 
see: Nurtanio

Nuvoli
(Prospero Nuvoli, Turin, Italy - Laboratorio Artigianale Aeronautico)
 Nuvoli N.3 (40 hp Salmson)
 Nuvoli N.3/S (90 hp Salmson)
 Nuvoli N.5R (Pobjoy R)
 Nuvoli N.5RR (Pobjoy)
 Nuvoli N.5T (Pobjoy R)
 Nuvoli N.5Cab (Fiat A.70)
 Nuvoli N.5Aq Alta Quota  Lab oratorio Artigianale Aeronautico Nuvoli
 Nuvoli ND 6.6

NuWaco 
(NuWaco Aircraft Co Inc, Calhan CO)
 NuWaco T-10

NVI
(Nationale Vliegtuig Industrie)

 NVI F.K.29
 NVI F.K.31
 NVI F.K.32
 NVI F.K.33
 NVI F.K.34
 NVI F.K.35

NWT Co
(Charleston, ME)
NWT Spruce Coupe

Nyge Aero
 Nyge Aero VLA-1

NZAI 
 NZAI CT-4 Airtrainer

References

Further reading

External links

 List of aircraft (N)